Thomas Craig Knight (born 28 June 1993) is an English first-class cricketer who has played first-class cricket and Twenty20 cricket for Derbyshire from 2011. He was born at Sheffield, Yorkshire. His contract was cancelled by mutual consent in July 2016.

References

1993 births
Living people
English cricketers
Derbyshire cricketers
Cricketers from Sheffield
English cricketers of the 21st century